Louis B. "Buck" Vocelle (August 4, 1926 – November 30, 1996) was a member of the Florida House of Representatives in from 1957 to 1962. He also served as chief judge of the Nineteenth Judicial Circuit Court of Florida.

References 

Members of the Florida House of Representatives
People from Vero Beach, Florida
1926 births
1996 deaths
20th-century American politicians